Yakov Naumovich Pokhis (born 24 January 1951), better known as Yakov Smirnoff, is a Ukrainian-American comedian, actor and writer. He began his career as a stand-up comedian in the Soviet Union, then immigrated to the United States in 1977 in order to pursue an American show business career, not yet knowing any English.

He reached his biggest success in the mid-to-late 1980s, appearing in several films which include Moscow on the Hudson with Robin Williams, The Money Pit with Tom Hanks, Heartburn with Jack Nicholson and Meryl Streep, and Brewster's Millions with Richard Pryor. He was a star of the television series What a Country! and was a recurring guest star on NBC's hit television series Night Court playing a part of Yakov Korolenko. His comic persona was of a naive immigrant from the Soviet Union who was perpetually confused and delighted by life in the United States. His humor combined a mockery of life under Communist states and of consumerism in the United States, as well as word play caused by misunderstanding of American phrases and culture, all punctuated by the catchphrase, "And I thought, 'What a country!'

The Fall of Communism starting in 1989 and the dissolution of the Soviet Union in 1991 brought an end to Smirnoff's widespread popularity, although he continued to perform. In 1993, he began performing year round at his own theater in Branson, Missouri. He occasionally still performs limited dates at his theater in Branson while touring worldwide. Smirnoff earned a master's degree in psychology from the University of Pennsylvania in 2006 and a doctorate in psychology and global leadership from Pepperdine University in 2019. He has also taught a course titled "The Business of Laughter" at Missouri State University and at Drury University.

Early life
The son of Naum Pokhis and Klara Pokhis, Smirnoff was born in Odessa, Ukraine, then part of the Soviet Union (USSR). He was an art teacher in Odessa, as well as a comedian. As a comedian, he entertained occasionally on ships in the Black Sea, where he came into contact with Americans who described life in the United States to him. That was when he first considered leaving the country.

After two years of attempting to leave, he came to the United States with his parents in 1977, arriving in New York City. His family was allowed to come to America because of "an agreement between the USSR and America to exchange wheat for Soviet citizens who wished to defect". At the time, neither he nor his parents spoke any English. On arrival to the United States, he was almost sent back to the USSR when his interpreter mistranslated his occupation, comedian, as "party organizer", which immigration authorities thought meant that he was an organizer for the Communist Party of the Soviet Union.

Smirnoff spent a portion of his early days in the United States working as a busboy and bartender at Grossingers Hotel in the Catskill Mountains of New York and living in the employee dormitory.

Career
Smirnoff began doing stand-up comedy in the US in the late 1970s. He chose the last name "Smirnoff" after trying to think of a name that Americans would be familiar with; he had learned about Smirnoff vodka in his bartending days.

In the early 1980s, he moved to Los Angeles to further pursue his stand-up comedy career. There he was roommates with two other aspiring comedians, Andrew Dice Clay and Thomas F. Wilson. He appeared often at renowned L.A. club The Comedy Store.

After achieving some level of fame, Smirnoff got his first break with a small role in the 1984 film Moscow on the Hudson; on the set, he helped star Robin Williams with his Russian dialogue. He subsequently appeared in several other motion pictures, including Buckaroo Banzai (1984), Brewster's Millions (1985) and The Money Pit (1986). Among his numerous appearances on television, he was featured many times on the sitcom Night Court as "Yakov Korolenko", and appeared as a comedian and guest on The Tonight Show Starring Johnny Carson.

He had a starring role in the 1986–87 television sitcom What a Country! In that show, he played a Russian cab driver studying for the U.S. citizenship test. In the late 1980s, Smirnoff was commissioned by ABC to provide educational bumper segments for Saturday morning cartoons Fun Facts, punctuated with a joke and Smirnoff's signature laugh.

In 1987, Smirnoff was invited to a party hosted by Washington Times editor-in-chief Arnaud de Borchgrave which featured President Ronald Reagan as the guest of honor. Reagan and Smirnoff immediately hit it off due to Reagan's love of jokes about life in the Soviet Union. Reagan enjoyed telling such jokes in speeches, and Smirnoff became one of his sources for new material. An example of a joke Reagan later told that originated from Smirnoff was "In Russia, if you say, 'Take my wife - please', you come home and she is gone." Smirnoff was enlisted by Dana Rohrabacher, who was then a speechwriter for Reagan, to help with material for Reagan's speeches, including a speech given in front of Soviet leader Mikhail Gorbachev when Reagan visited the Soviet Union during the Moscow Summit in 1988. Rohrabacher later stated that Smirnoff became "one of the inner circle" of speechwriting advisers during Reagan's final years in office, due to the quality of Smirnoff's suggestions.

In 1988, Smirnoff was the featured entertainer at the annual White House Correspondents' Dinner and he appeared in some commercials for hotel chain Best Western.

Since 1993, he has been performing at his own 2,000-seat theater, and over the years has entertained more than 5 million people in a live setting. His 28th consecutive season was commemorated in Branson, Missouri in 2021. In the late 1990s he retooled his stand-up act to focus on the differences between men and women, and on solving problems within relationships.

In 2002, Yakov Smirnoff appeared in an episode on King of the Hill, "The Bluegrass Is Always Greener". Also, in an episode on The Simpsons, "The Old Man and the Key".

In 2003, he appeared on Broadway in a one-man show, As Long As We Both Shall Laugh, quoted by The New York Times as "Warmhearted, delightful, and splendidly funny!". He was a featured writer for AARP Magazine and gave readers advice in his column, "Happily Ever Laughter".

After a successful career in television, movies and Broadway, Smirnoff received a master's degree in psychology from the University of Pennsylvania. He has taught classes at Drury University along with Missouri State University on this topic. He also gives seminars and self-help workshops on the topic of improving relationships. Smirnoff earned his doctorate in psychology and global leadership at Pepperdine University, graduating on May 18, 2019.

In 2016, Smirnoff produced and starred a PBS Comedy Special, Happily Ever Laughter, which was named "PBS Special of the Year of 2016–2017".

Comedy style

"America: What a country!"
Some of Smirnoff's jokes involved word play based on a limited understanding of American idioms and culture:
 "I go to New York and I saw a big sign saying 'America Loves Smirnoff' and I said to myself, what a country!"
 Upon being offered work as a barman on a "graveyard shift", he remarks, 'A bar in a cemetery! What a country! Last call? During Happy Hour the place must be dead.'
 At the grocery store: "Powdered milk, powdered eggs, baby powder ... what a country!"
 At the grocery store after finding "New Freedom" Maxi Pads: "Freedom in a box! What a country!"
 "The first time I went to a restaurant, they asked me, 'How many in your party?' and I said, 'Six hundred million'."
 "In Russia, we don't eat that part of the dog."

Other jokes involved comparisons between the U.S. and the U.S.S.R.:
 "I like parades without missiles in them. I'll take Bullwinkle to a tank any day'"
 "In every country, they make fun of city. In U.S. you make fun of Cleveland. In Russia, we make fun of Cleveland."
 "Why don't they have baseball in Soviet Union? In Soviet Union, no one is safe."
 "Here you have American Express Card: 'Don't Leave Home Without It.' In Russia, we have Russian Express Card: 'Don't Leave Home!'"
 "In America, you can always find a party. In Russia, party find you!"

He once told Johnny Carson, "I enjoy being in America: it's fun, you know, because you have, you have so many things we never had in Russia—like warning shots".

Russian reversal

Smirnoff is often credited with inventing or popularizing the type of joke known as the "Russian reversal", in which life "in Soviet Russia" or "in Russia" is described through an unexpected flip of a sentence's subject and object; a type of chiasmus. While such jokes predated Smirnoff's act, and he rarely told them, one exception was a 1985 Miller Lite commercial, in which Smirnoff stated, "In America, there is plenty of light beer and you can always find a party. In Russia, Party always finds you." Since the 1980s, Smirnoff has become more associated with the forms as the Russian reversal joke has become a common cultural meme. The joke has been used in TV and cartoons like Family Guy, typically uttered in the style of Smirnoff.

Painting
Smirnoff is also a painter and has frequently featured the Statue of Liberty in his art since receiving his U.S. citizenship. On the night of the September 11, 2001, terrorist attacks, he started a painting inspired by his feelings about the event, based on an image of the Statue of Liberty. Just prior to the first anniversary of the attacks, he paid US$100,000 for his painting to be transformed into a large mural. Its dimensions were 200 feet by 135 feet (61 m by 41 m). The mural, titled "America's Heart," is a pointillist-style piece, with one brush-stroke for each victim of the attacks. Sixty volunteers from the Sheet Metal Workers Union erected the mural on a damaged skyscraper overlooking the ruins of the World Trade Center. The mural remained there until November 2003, when it was removed because of storm damage. Various pieces of the mural can now be seen on display at his theater in Branson, Missouri.

The only stipulation he put on the hanging of the mural was that his name not be listed as the painter. He signed it: "The human spirit is not measured by the size of the act, but by the size of the heart."

Personal life
Smirnoff became an American citizen on 4 July 1986.

Smirnoff had a wife, Linda; they divorced in 2001. They have two children: a daughter, Natasha, born in 1990, and a son, Alexander, born in 1992.

He remarried in 2019 to Olivia Kosarieva.

Filmography
Among his film credits, Smirnoff has co-starred in movies with Robin Williams (Moscow on the Hudson, 1984), Tom Hanks (The Money Pit, 1986), and Jack Nicholson and Meryl Streep (Heartburn, 1986), in addition to single episodes of several TV series.

Moscow on the Hudson (1984) as Lev
The Adventures of Buckaroo Banzai Across the 8th Dimension (1984) as National Security Advisor
Brewster's Millions (1985) as Vladimir
The Money Pit (1986) as Shatov
Heartburn (1986) as Contractor Laszlo
What a Country! (1986-1987, TV Series) as Nikolai Rostapovich
Up Your Alley (1989) as Russian Man
Night Court (1990, TV Series) as Yakov Korolenko

References

External links
 
 
 
  Interview.

1951 births
Drury University faculty
Internet memes
Jewish American male comedians
Living people
People from Branson, Missouri
Entertainers from Odesa
Soviet emigrants to the United States
University of Pennsylvania alumni
People with acquired American citizenship
Comedians from Missouri
20th-century American comedians
21st-century American comedians
Jewish Ukrainian comedians
Odesa Jews
21st-century American Jews